Hartmeyeria is a genus of ascidian tunicates in the family Pyuridae.

Species within the genus Hartmeyeria include:
 Hartmeyeria arctica Korczynski, 1989 
 Hartmeyeria bouilloni Monniot & Monniot, 1976 
 Hartmeyeria chinensis Tokioka, 1967 
 Hartmeyeria formosa (Herdman, 1881) 
 Hartmeyeria hupferi (Hartmeyer, 1909) 
 Hartmeyeria monarchica Hartmeyer, 1922 
 Hartmeyeria orientalis Oka, 1929 
 Hartmeyeria pedunculata (Peres, 1949) 
 Hartmeyeria triangularis Ritter, 1913

Species names currently considered to be synonyms:
 Hartmeyeria longistigmata Tokioka, 1949: synonym of Hartmeyeria triangularis Ritter, 1913

References

Stolidobranchia
Tunicate genera